Ibrahim Samuel Amada (born 28 February 1990) is a Malagasy professional footballer who last played for Al-Qadsiah and the Madagascar national football team as a midfielder.

Club career
Amada was born in Antananarivo, Madagascar.

On 30 January 2011, Amada went on trial with Algerian club JS Kabylie. A few days later, he signed a one-year contract with the club becoming the first Malagasy player to sign in Algeria. On 4 March 2011, Amada made his official debut for JS Kabylie in a 2010–11 Algerian Cup match against ES Mostaganem playing the entire game as JS Kabylie won 1–0. Amada was released from the club at the end of season, making just 11 league appearances.

On 28 July 2012, Amada signed a three-year contract with USM El Harrach.

On 30 January 2022, Amada joined Saudi Arabian club Al-Qadsiah.

International career
On 11 October 2008, Amada made his debut for the Madagascar national football team in 2010 FIFA World Cup qualifier against Ivory Coast as a substitute in the 74th minute. However, Madagascar went on to lose the game 3–0.

Career statistics

International

International goals

Scores and results list Madagascar's goal tally first.

Honours

Club
Academie Ny Antsika
THB Champions League (1): 2008 

ES Sétif
 Algerian Ligue Professionnelle 1 (1): 2016–17
Algerian Super Cup (1): 2015

JS Kabylie
 Algerian Cup (1): 2011

Individual
Academie Ny Antsika
 THB Champions League Best Player (1): 2008 

MC Alger
 Algerian Ligue Professionnelle 1 Best Foreign Player (1): 2018–19

National team
Knight Order of Madagascar: 2019

References

External links
 DZFoot Profile
 Académie JMG Profile
 
 

Living people
1990 births
Malagasy footballers
Madagascar international footballers
Association football forwards
Academie Ny Antsika players
JS Kabylie players
AS Khroub players
USM El Harrach players
ES Sétif players
MC Alger players
Al-Khor SC players
Al-Markhiya SC players
Al-Qadsiah FC players
Algerian Ligue Professionnelle 1 players
Qatar Stars League players
Qatari Second Division players
Saudi First Division League players
Malagasy expatriate footballers
Malagasy expatriate sportspeople in Algeria
Malagasy expatriate sportspeople in Qatar
Expatriate footballers in Algeria
Expatriate footballers in Qatar
Expatriate footballers in Saudi Arabia
Malagasy Muslims
People from Antananarivo
2019 Africa Cup of Nations players
Recipients of orders, decorations, and medals of Madagascar